Susanville Municipal Airport  is a city-owned, public-use airport located five nautical miles (6 mi, 9 km) southeast of the central business district of Susanville, a city in Lassen County, California, United States. It is included in the National Plan of Integrated Airport Systems for 2011–2015, which categorized it as a general aviation facility.

Facilities and aircraft 
Susanville Municipal Airport covers an area of 130 acres (53 ha) at an elevation of 4,149 feet (1,265 m) above mean sea level. It has two runways: 11/29 is 4,051 by 75 feet (1,235 x 23 m) with an asphalt surface and 7/25 is 2,180 by 60 feet (664 x 18 m) with a dirt surface. It also has two helipads: H1 is 120 by 120 feet (37 x 37 m) and H2 is 65 by 65 feet (20 x 20 m).

For the 12-month period ending December 31, 2011, the airport had 12,470 aircraft operations, an average of 34 per day: 93% general aviation, 6% air taxi, and <1% military. At that time there were 47 aircraft based at this airport: 81% single-engine, 11% multi-engine, 2% helicopter, and 6% ultralight.

References

External links 
 

Airports in Lassen County, California